Khajwa Kutni Dam is a multipurpose river canal project on Kutni river situated in Khajwa, Madhya Pradesh, India.It is the largest dam in Chhatarpur district.The dam  across the Kutni river and it is 7 km from Rajnagar, 12 km from Khajuraho and 40 km from Chhatarpur District.The dam is famous for its beauty and vastness and Kutni island resor,hotel is located in Kutni dam khajwa town.

Facilities 

The dam is 25 metres high and lies across the Kutni River. It acts as an irrigation and water supply for villages, towns and cities in the area. There is a proposal to increase the supply of water available for irrigation by building a canal on the left bank of Bariarpur, drawing water from the Ken River.
Kutni Island Resort Hotel in Khajwa is located on the small island of Kutni Dam.

Kutni Dam Canal Project 
The Kutni Dam canal project started in 2009 or 2010 and was completed and opened in 2013 or 2014.

See also 
List of reservoirs and dams in India

References 

Dams in Madhya Pradesh
Chhatarpur district
Dams completed in the 2010s
2010s establishments in Madhya Pradesh
Year of establishment missing